CR7 may refer to:

 Cristiano Ronaldo, Portuguese footballer, sometimes referred to as "CR7", in allusion to his initials and shirt number
 Cosmos Redshift 7, a high-redshift galaxy, about 12.9 billion light-years from Earth
 CR7, a postcode district in the CR postcode area of south London
 CR7 Motorsports, a NASCAR race team
 CRJ700, the 70-seat version of the Canadair Regional Jet (CRJ)
 CR-7(E), last high-end cassette deck by Nakamichi
 Defu MRT station, Singapore, MRT station code
 Nike CR7, a Nike brand Cristiano Ronaldo line
 Callum Robinson, Irish footballer, sometimes referred to as "CR7", in allusion to his initials and shirt number